Silab (also Romanized as Sīlāb) is a village in Zilayi Rural District, Margown District, Boyer-Ahmad County, Kohgiluyeh and Boyer-Ahmad Province, Iran. At the 2006 census, its population was 108, in 19 families.

References 

Populated places in Boyer-Ahmad County